Caribbean Studies may refer to:

The study of the Caribbean islands, the Caribbean people, the Caribbean Community or the Caribbean sea
Caribbean Studies (UPR), a journal published by the University of Puerto Rico and the research institute which publishes it

See also
Caribbean (disambiguation)